Manuel Jiménez (2 February 1940 – 27 September 2017) was a Spanish archer. He competed in the men's individual and team events at the 1988 Summer Olympics.

References

1940 births
2017 deaths
Spanish male archers
Olympic archers of Spain
Archers at the 1988 Summer Olympics
Place of birth missing